Frankenfels is a market town with 1956 inhabitants (2019) in St. Pölten-Land which is a district of the state of Lower Austria, Austria.

Population

Sights
 The cave of Nixhöhle de
 The Falkensteinmauer de
 The Taubenbachklamm de
 The Castle Weißenburg de
 The Annakreuz de
 The Schwabeck-Kreuz (on the border of Texingtal) de

References

 
Cities and towns in St. Pölten-Land District